Ivan Penelov (born May 18, 1948) is a former Bulgarian ice hockey player. He played for the Bulgaria men's national ice hockey team at the 1976 Winter Olympics in Innsbruck.

References

1948 births
Living people
Bulgarian ice hockey defencemen
Ice hockey players at the 1976 Winter Olympics
Olympic ice hockey players of Bulgaria